Novi grad is a city district of Osijek, Croatia. It has 16,520 inhabitants distributed in 6,210 households.

Day of the city district is on 5 July, on feast of Saints Cyril and Methodius.

Its name in Croatian literally means "New Town".

History  

Novi grad has emerged in the end of 18th century with arrival of German immigrants.

References 

Districts of Osijek